Go Space is a 1996 studio album by the Leningrad Cowboys. It differed from all their previous live and studio releases in that it consisted of original songs, while previous albums were composed mostly of covers of hit songs by other artists.

Track listing

Personnel
The Leningrad Cowboys:
Twist Twist Erkinhariju – drums
Ben Granfelt – guitar
Sakke Järvenpää – vocals
Vesa Kääpä – guitar
Jore Marjaranta – vocals
Esa Niiva – saxophone
Pemo Ojala – trumpet
Silu Seppälä – bass
Mauri Sumén – accordion, keyboards
Mato Valtonen – vocals

The Alexandrov Red Army Ensemble:
Valeri Gavva – bass vocals
Vladimir Gusev – dorma
Aleksandr Hristachev – bass vocals
Ilja Kosarevskij – balalaika
Vladimir Prohorov – dorma
Dimitrij Somov – administration
Vasilij Stefutsa – tenor vocals
Viktor Temerev – balalaika
Aleksandr Toschev – tenor vocals

The Leningrad Ladies:
Mari Hatakka – backing vocals on "Galina"
Tiina Isohanni – backing vocals on "Galina"

Richard G. Johnson – additional voices

Additional musicians:
Paavo Maijanen – backing vocals and bas on "I Hate You" intro/outro
T.T. Oksala – loops and samples
Heikki Kangasniemi – fiddle on "Emerald Blues"
Tatu Kemppainen – guitar and mandolin on "Emerald Blues"
Kurt Lindblad – tin whistle on "Emerald Blues" and "Bumpersticker Rock"
Puka Oinonen – saw on "Lumberjack Lady"
Mika Salo – guitar solo on "Mardi Gras Ska"
Julle Ekblad – backing vocals on "There's Someone Smiling Down on Me"

Singles

"Where's the Moon"
CD: Johanna Kustannus/1000 120432 (Finland)
"Where's the Moon" – 3:49
"Universal Fields" – 3:32

CD: BMG Ariola/74321 35645 2 (Germany)
"Where's the Moon" – 3:49
"Universal Fields" – 3:32
"Answering Machine Messages (bonus track)
"Just a Moment" – 0:56
"You Are Just a Mobilephone" – 0:39
"Drunken Bitch" – 0:56
"Hello Loser!" – 0:48
"Mr. Seppälä - The Healthnut" – 0:23
"Outerspace" – 0:29

"Jupiter Calling"
CD: BMG Ariola/74321 36126 2 (Germany)
"Jupiter Calling" – 3:00
"Galina" – 3:13
"Showtime" – 3:08

Charts

References

External links

1996 albums
Leningrad Cowboys albums